Batman vs. Teenage Mutant Ninja Turtles is a 2019 American animated superhero film directed by Jake Castorena and written by Marly Halpern-Graser, based on the comic book miniseries Batman/Teenage Mutant Ninja Turtles by James Tynion IV and Freddie Williams II. The story focuses on Batman, Robin, and Batgirl teaming up with the Teenage Mutant Ninja Turtles in order to save Gotham City from chaos at the hands of both Shredder and Ra's al Ghul. The film features the voices of Troy Baker, Eric Bauza, Darren Criss, Kyle Mooney, and Baron Vaughn.

Batman vs. Teenage Mutant Ninja Turtles is the first collaboration between Warner Bros. Entertainment and Nickelodeon (once co-owned by then-parent Warner Communications until 1985), and the first Teenage Mutant Ninja Turtles film to be distributed by Warner Bros. in the United States since TMNT. It was produced for the direct-to-video market, and was released on both Blu-ray and Digital HD on June 4, 2019. It received positive reviews and grossed over $3.3 million from home video sales.

Plot
While touring Powers Industrial, Barbara Gordon witnesses a power generator being stolen by the Foot Clan and also spots four mysterious and elusive creatures during the robbery that she believes are metahumans. The Foot Clan attacks Wayne Enterprises to steal an experimental cloud seeder machine, but are ambushed by Batman, who fends off the Foot and their leader, Shredder. Meanwhile, the four "metahumans" Batgirl sighted—actually the Teenage Mutant Ninja Turtles—arrive in Gotham tracking the Shredder, who has allied with an unknown party. After defending Wayne Enterprises from the Penguin, the Turtles encounter and fight Batman, as each side believes the other is working with the Shredder. Batman is able to overpower the Turtles, who retreat.

Donatello researches Batman and his sighted locations, and uses this information to figure out the location of the Batcave. After a brief scuffle with Robin, Batman and Batgirl arrive, and the Turtles introduce themselves and explain their reason for coming to Gotham. The two groups agree to work together against their common enemies, and Robin reveals that Shredder and the Foot Clan are working with Ra's al Ghul and the League of Assassins. Shredder and Ra's meet and strike a bargain: Ra's will give Shredder access to the Lazarus Pit to become immortal, in exchange for Shredder building a machine that will spray a combination of TCRI mutagen and Joker venom over Gotham, transforming the citizens into insane mutants that will destroy the city. With Shredder's failure to steal the cloud seeder, Ra's hires the Penguin to intercept it, while he and Shredder go to Arkham Asylum and release the Joker. The two trade Joker TCRI mutagen for the Joker venom formula, and Joker uses the mutagen on Arkham's inmates.

The Bat-Family and the Turtles are alerted about an alarm at Arkham by Commissioner Gordon and investigate. After fighting their way through various members of Batman's rogues gallery, they confront Harley Quinn and Joker, mutated into a spotted hyena and a king cobra. Joker injects Batman with a mixture of Joker venom and mutagen, transforming him into a deranged mutant vampire bat. The heroes are able to inject Batman with an anti-mutagen and restore him, and subdue Harley and Joker. Batgirl learns about the cloud seeder's theft by Penguin, and they realize the incident at Arkham was a distraction. Aware that Shredder and Ra's will be using Joker venom, they deduce they will be at Ace Chemicals to create it.

At Ace Chemicals, the Bat-family and the Turtles fight through the Foot Clan and the League of Assassins with the Batmobile and the Turtle Van. While Batman fights Shredder and Leonardo engages Ra's, Donatello and Michelangelo sabotage the cloud seeder as it launches. Leonardo subdues Ra's, and Batman is able to defeat the Shredder with a distraction from Raphael. The cloud seeder crashes into the facility and explodes, knocking the Shredder into a vat of Joker venom and destroying Ace Chemicals. At the Batcave, the Turtles prepare to return to New York until Batman reveals a surprise pizza party to celebrate their victory.

In a post-credits scene, Shredder emerges from the rubble of Ace Chemicals, now possessing a Joker-like appearance and laughing maniacally.

Voice cast
 Troy Baker as Batman, Joker
 Eric Bauza as Leonardo
 Darren Criss as Raphael
 Baron Vaughn as Donatello
 Kyle Mooney as Michelangelo
 Ben Giroux as Robin
 Rachel Bloom as Batgirl
 Brian George as Alfred Pennyworth
 Jim Meskimen as Commissioner Gordon, Scarecrow
 Andrew Kishino as Shredder
 Cas Anvar as Ra's al Ghul
 Keith Ferguson as Dr. Baxter Stockman, Two-Face
 Tom Kenny as Penguin, League of Assassins Ninja
 Tara Strong as Harley Quinn, Poison Ivy, Pizza Delivery Girl, Woman
 John DiMaggio as Mr. Freeze
 Carlos Alazraqui as Bane

Production

Development
Warner Bros. Animation was considering adaptations of Batman/Teenage Mutant Ninja Turtles and Wonder Woman as possible direct-to-video films. The animated adaptation of the miniseries was officially announced in February 2019 to be in production and was released later in the spring.

Casting
The initial announcement revealed Troy Baker would reprise his roles as both Batman from Batman: The Telltale Series video game and various Lego video games and films, and the Joker from Batman: Arkham Origins, Batman: Assault on Arkham, and the Batman Unlimited series, making Baker the first actor to portray both characters in the same property. The film also features Darren Criss and Eric Bauza reprising their roles as Raphael and Leonardo, while Kyle Mooney and Baron Vaughn voice Michelangelo and Donatello, respectively. Rachel Bloom voices Batgirl and Cas Anvar voices Ra's al Ghul. In addition, Tom Kenny, John DiMaggio, Carlos Alazraqui and Tara Strong reprise their roles as the Penguin, Mr. Freeze, Bane, Harley Quinn and Poison Ivy from various DC properties. Other key cast members of the film were revealed a month later, which consists of Ben Giroux as Robin, Andrew Kishino as the Shredder, Keith Ferguson as both Baxter Stockman and Two-Face, Brian George reprising his role as Alfred Pennyworth from Batman: The Killing Joke, and Jim Meskimen as both Commissioner James Gordon and the Scarecrow.

Release

Marketing
The first trailer was released on March 12, 2019. The film had its world premiere at WonderCon Anaheim 2019 on March 31.

Home media
The film was later released to Digital on May 14 on 4K Ultra HD Combo Pack and Blu-ray Combo Pack on June 4, 2019.

The film earned $609,769 from domestic DVD sales and $2,723,251 from domestic Blu-ray sales, bringing its total domestic home video earnings to $3,333,020.

Reception

Critical response
Batman vs. Teenage Mutant Ninja Turtles was released to positive reviews.

References

External links

 DC page
 

2010s animated superhero films
Animated Batman films
Animated Teenage Mutant Ninja Turtles films
Animated superhero crossover films
2010s English-language films
Nickelodeon animated films
Ninja films
Warner Bros. Animation animated films
2019 martial arts films
2019 direct-to-video films
Animated teen superhero films
American direct-to-video films
2010s American animated films
Warner Bros. direct-to-video films
Warner Bros. direct-to-video animated films
Animated films about turtles
Animated films about brothers